Reinaldo del Carmen Sánchez Olivares (born 17 October 1944) is a Chilean entrepreneur and leader of the Chilean football who served as president of the Asociación Nacional de Fútbol Profesional (ANFP).

In August 2021, he returned to the presidency of Santiago Wanderers.

Biography
He attended the Rubén Castro school in Vina del Mar. Then, when Sánchez was young, he had a brief period in the Mechanics career at the Pontifical Catholic University of Valparaíso. After that, he started in the minibus business, becoming to own a fleet of around 150 buses. He has been president of the Cooperativa Expresos Viña and the Higher Transport Council of the Valparaíso Region.

In 1992, he became president of the Santiago Wanderers, the oldest professional club of the Chilean football in which he was a member from 1976 to 2001. That last year, Sánchez ran for the presidency of the ANFP, being elected on 24 September by 27 votes to 16 over Luis Alberto Simián, son of Eduardo Simián (1915−1995), former minister of State and professional footballer. He took office of the Association on 1 October 2001.

During its leadership time, the Chilean men's adult team had bad performances in qualifying for the 2002 and 2006 FIFA World Cup qualifiers, last process where Chile was near to qualify under Juvenal Olmos, who was fired by Sánchez in April 2005. Although he was replaced by Nelson Acosta −historical Uruguayan−Chilean coach− the Chilean team failed to reverse its poor results.

By the other hand, among his successful ponints was the creation of the Canal del Fútbol (CDF) in 2003 as well as to obtain in 2006 the organization of the 2008 FIFA U-20 Women's World Cup. On 5 October 2006, Sánchez resigned from the presidency of the ANFP.

In 2007, in one of the worst crises of Santiago Wanderers, he was released from the club after being accused as being responsible for the situation. Similarly, his successor in the ANFP, Harold Mayne-Nicholls, accused him of having left a deficit of US$1.7 billion in the association, a complaint that was denied by Sánchez, who defended his period claiming to have paid all the debts he received from Bauzá's administration.

References

Notes

External Links
 News of Sánchez at RedGol

1944 births
Living people
Pontifical Catholic University of Valparaíso alumni
Presidents of the ANFP
Santiago Wanderers chairmen and investors